State Road 230 (SR 230) is a short state highway in northeastern Florida that runs between Starke, Florida and Camp Blanding. It runs east and west and is always no more than two lanes wide. Within the Starke city limits, and slightly beyond, the road is known as Call Street.

Route description
State Road 230 begins in front of the Old Bradford County Courthouse which is at the northeast corner of US 301, one block north of SR 100. West of this intersection, West Call Street is a city street, and both sides of the intersection are restricted to right turns on US 301. This part of the road also runs through the Call Street Historic District, and a pair of CSX Transportation railroad lines that once carried Amtrak's Palmetto runs between Thompson and Cherry Streets.

As the road crosses the Clay County Line, it is simply named SR 230, where it passes by the Starke Golf and Country Club. The road enters Camp Blanding territory on the same straight path, until curving to the north, while Kingsley Road continues to the east. SR 230 contains two endings at SR 16. The first is an extension for westbound traffic. The second is along Kingsley Lake, where SR 16 runs north momentarily until curving back to the east.

Major intersections

Related routes

County Road 230A is a spur of State Road 230 southeast of Starke. It runs north from CR 100A to SR 230.

References

External links

Routes 230 - 239 at Florida's Great Renumbering
Florida Route Log(SR 230)

230
230
230